Hartvig Caspar Christie (25 November 1893 – 21 March 1959) was a Norwegian politician for the Conservative Party.

He was born in Hornnes.

A priest by profession, he was elected to the Norwegian Parliament from Akershus in 1950 and was later re-elected on two occasions. He had previously served in the position of deputy representative during the term 1945–1949. A year into his third term in Parliament, he died and was replaced by Dagny Fridrichsen.

References

1893 births
1959 deaths
Norwegian writers
Norwegian priest-politicians
Conservative Party (Norway) politicians
Members of the Storting
20th-century Norwegian politicians
Norwegian people of Scottish descent
People from Evje og Hornnes